Bussard is a surname. Notable people with the surname include:

Joe Bussard (1936–2022), American collector of 78-rpm records
Ray Bussard (1928–2010), swimming coach
Robert W. Bussard (1928–2007), American physicist

See also
Boussard, surname